Franz-Josef Ulm (born March 9, 1964 in Fürth/Bavaria, West Germany) is a Structural Engineer, an Engineering Scientist and a Professor since 1999. He is Professor of Civil & Environmental Engineering at the Massachusetts Institute of Technology (MIT), the Faculty Director of the Concrete Sustainability Hub (CSHub@MIT). He is credited for discovering the nanogranular structure of Calcium-Silicate-Hydrates (C-S-H), the binding phase of concrete, and for the development of concepts of nanoengineering of concrete which combine advanced nanomechanics experiments with molecular simulation results. He speaks up for an environmental sustainable engineering, with “greener” concrete with lower  footprint, to reduce the carbon footprint of concrete; to enhance concrete's resilience; and reduce its impact on global warming.

Early career 
Ulm grew up in Fürth/Bavaria and Erlangen as son of Udo Ulm and Hertha Ulm, both Structural Engineers. Following National Service as a nurse in a surgical hospital in Erlangen, he studied Civil Engineering at the Technical University of Munich, where he graduated in 1990 with a “Diplom Ingenieur (Bauingenieur)”(Eq. MSc) degree. He continued his studies at Ecole National des Ponts et Chaussees, as a research assistance at LCPC, receiving a Docteur-Ingenieur degree (eq. Ph.D.) from ENPC in January 1994, with a specialization in Materials and Structures. During this time, he worked closely with Olivier Coussy on the English translation of Coussy's book “Mechanics of Porous Continua”. The collaboration of Ulm with Coussy led to the development of the Continuum Chemomechanics theory which has been applied by Ulm and co-workers to Early–Age Concrete and risk evalDiuation of concrete cracking relevant for massive concrete structures in innovative bridge and tunneling applications; to prediction of premature deterioration of concrete structures due to the Alkali-Silica Reactions; and the deleterious effects of calcium leaching of concrete relevant for nuclear waste storage applications. In 1996, he became Chargé de Recherche (Research Scientist) of the French Ministry of Public Works. During his tenure at LCPC, he was head of the Research group of concrete and concrete composite behavior and modeling. In 1998, he obtained the habilitation degree from the Ecole Normal Superieur de Cachan with a habilitation thesis on chemomechanics of concrete materials and structures.

Academic career 
Ulm joined MIT in January 1999, where he specialized in experimental nano- and micromechanics of cement-based materials, shales and bones. With his research group, he developed statistical nanoindentation techniques for hydrated nanocomposites; an indentation technique that permits via statistical analysis to link chemistry and mechanical behavior at 10s of nanometer length scales. In 2007, his group discovered that cementitious materials at nanoscale exhibit a nanogranular behavior driven by particle-to-particle contact forces. This nanogranular origin was found to drive much of the strength and durability performance of cementitious materials, such as the long-term creep behavior and fire resistance. A similar nanogranular nature was found for shales and bones. In 2008, he joined forces with a group of physicists and computational material scientists to combine experimental nanoindentation investigations with molecular and meso-scale simulations of cement hydrates. Specifically, the collaboration with Roland Pellenq, a CNRS Research Director and Senior Research Scientist at MIT, allowed identification of the molecular structure of calcium-silicate hydrates, the binding phase of concrete which lends its strength and durability to concrete at engineering scales. By incorporating concepts of glass physics and soft matter physics into cement science, Ulm and co-workers showed by means of a molecular combinatorial approach that concrete's fundamental strength could be elevated without changing the chemistry of its constituents, i.e. Calcium, Silica and Water. The handshake of molecular simulation techniques with experimental nanoscale experiments opened a novel way to address the concrete sustainability challenge to reduce the environmental impact while sustaining its role as the backbone material for housing, shelter and infrastructure worldwide. The challenge led, in 2009, to the foundation of the Concrete Sustainability Hub at MIT (CSHub@MIT). This novel industry–academia partnership between the Portland Cement Association (Skokie, Illinois), the National Ready Mixed Concrete Association (Silver Spring, Maryland) and MIT aims at reducing the environmental footprint of concrete, while enhancing its resilience from materials to structures and urban community scale.

Awards 
2002	Robert L’Hermite Medaille, RILEM
2005	Walter L. Huber Civil Engineering Research Prize
2010	Maurice A. Biot lecture at Columbia University
2011	Stephen Brunauer Award, American Ceramic Society
2012	Theodore von Karman Medal, American Society of Civil Engineers
2013	Best paper award 2012: Acta Geotechnica
2013	Engineering Mechanics Institute Fellow
2013	Engineering News Record Award of Excellence
2014	Elected Member of European Academy of Sciences and Arts
2022	Elected Member of National Academy of Engineering

References 

1964 births
Living people
German civil engineers
American scientists
German emigrants to the United States
MIT School of Engineering faculty
People from Fürth
Engineering educators
Technical University of Munich alumni
Engineers from Bavaria